New Hampshire is a state located in the Northeastern United States. It is divided into 234 municipalities, including 221 towns and 13 cities. New Hampshire is organized along the New England town model, where the state is nearly completely incorporated and divided into towns, some of which the state has designated as "cities".  For each town/city, the table lists the county to which it belongs, its date of incorporation, its population according to the 2010 census, its form of government, and its principal villages. Cities are indicated in boldface. Cities and towns are treated identically under state law. 

New Hampshire also has a small number of townships, grants, gores and other unincorporated areas which are not part of any municipality.  These are small and rare, with most located in Coös County, and cover a small amount of the land and population of the state.

Municipal government 

Historically, the distinction between towns and cities was the form of government. Towns are led by a board of selectmen, who enforce municipal ordinances enacted during town meetings. Cities are led by a mayor, who enforces ordinances passed by a city council or a board of aldermen. City charters are granted by special act of the New Hampshire General Court. The most recent town to be granted city status was Lebanon, in 1957. In 1979, the General Court established new processes for towns to change the form of government, and such changes no longer confer city status. Towns may drop the town meeting by local vote and adopt a new charter for a representative government, such as a council-manager form, and retain their status as a town.

Generally, government forms come in several varieties:

The standard form has a board of selectmen acting as the town executive, while the entire voting population of the town acts as the town legislature in a form known as a town meeting.
Some towns have adopted a town manager to act as the town executive. In those cases the board of selectmen acts as the town legislature, while town meetings are advisory in nature. This form functions as the council-manager municipal form.
Other towns have abolished their boards of selectmen and replaced it with a town council, to form a council-manager system.
Prior to 1979, to abolish the board of selectmen and open town meeting required the town to be rechartered by the state legislature as a city, whereby the city charter would establish a representative government for the town, usually a board of aldermen or city council and led by a mayor and/or city manager.

Regardless of which form of government a municipality uses, and whether it calls itself a city or town, all cities and towns are treated identically by the state law.

List of municipalities
Cities are listed in bold. The column labeled "populated places" lists the villages, census designated places, and other unincorporated communities within the town borders.

See also
 List of counties in New Hampshire
 List of places in New Hampshire
 Lists of cities in the United States
 New Hampshire communities by household income
 New Hampshire locations by per capita income

Notes

References

New Hampshire, List of cities in
 
New Hampshire
Cities